HMS Upholder (P37) was a Royal Navy U-class submarine built by Vickers-Armstrong at Barrow-in-Furness.  She was laid down on 30 October 1939, launched on 8 July 1940 by Mrs. Doris Thompson, wife of a director of the builders. The submarine was commissioned on 31 October 1940. She was one of four U-class submarines which had two external  torpedo tubes at the bows in addition to the 4 internal ones fitted to all boats.  They were excluded from the others because they interfered with depth-keeping at periscope depth.

Career
 She was commanded for her entire career by Lieutenant-Commander Malcolm David Wanklyn, and became the most successful British submarine of the Second World War.  After a working up period, she left for Malta on 10 December 1940 and was attached to the 10th Submarine Flotilla based there. She completed 24 patrols, sinking 93,031 tons of enemy shipping including four warships; the   after the Battle of the Duisburg Convoy, two submarines (Tricheco and ) and an auxiliary minesweeper, and ten merchant ships; three troopships, six cargo ships, and an auxiliary transport.

Wanklyn was awarded the Victoria Cross for a patrol in her in 1941, which included an attack on a particularly well-defended convoy on 24 May 1941 in which Upholder sank the  Italian troop ship .

Upholder also damaged the German freighter Duisburg, the French tanker Capitaine Damiani, the Italian freighters Dandolo and Sirio and destroyed the wreck of the German freighter Arta already grounded after the battle of the Tarigo Convoy.

Successes

Sinking
Upholder was lost with all hands on her 25th patrol, which was to have been her last before she returned to England. She left for patrol on 6 April 1942 and became overdue on 14 April.

Theories about her loss

The attack was 100 miles northeast from Wanklyn's patrol area and he may have changed position to find more targets. It is also possible that the submarine was sunk by a mine on 11 April 1942 near Tripoli, when a submarine was reported close to a minefield. A third and less likely theory came from an alleged air and surface attack on a submarine contact by German aircraft and the escort of a convoy on 14 April off Misrata, but no official Axis record of this action was found after the end of World War II.

More recent research carried out by Italian naval specialist Francesco Mattesini points to a German aerial patrol supporting the same convoy, comprising two Dornier Do 17 and two Messerschmitt Bf 110 aircraft, that attacked an underwater contact with bombs two hours before the Pegaso incident. The author also asserts that the seaplane crew was unsure if the target they pinpointed to Pegaso was a submarine or a school of dolphins. Mattesini admits the possibility that Pegaso could have finished off the submarine previously damaged by the German aircraft.

Canadian naval researcher Platon Alexiades has concluded that the Pegaso and German aircraft claims can be dismissed outright. Close examinations of British records show that submarine could not have been in the positions where these attacks occurred. Following an ULTRA intercept and a signal from Captain S.10 (the 10th flotilla commander), it is most likely HMS Upholder was lost on a mine as she was proceeding to intercept the Monreale/Unione convoy on 13 April. Her likely route would have brought her close to an Italian minefield laid by the destroyers Alvise Da Mosto and Giovanni da Verrazzano on 1st May 1941 (section d AN of the "T" minefield) some 15 miles north of Tripoli.

Tribute
When, on 22 August 1942, the Admiralty announced her loss, the communiqué carried with it an unusual tribute to Wanklyn and his men: "It is seldom proper for Their Lordships to draw distinction between different services rendered in the course of naval duty, but they take this opportunity of singling out those of HMS Upholder, under the command of Lt.Cdr. David Wanklyn, for special mention. She was long employed against enemy communications in the Central Mediterranean, and she became noted for the uniformly high quality of her services in that arduous and dangerous duty. Such was the standard of skill and daring set by Lt.Cdr. Wanklyn and the officers and men under him that they and their ship became an inspiration not only to their own flotilla, but to the Fleet of which it was a part and to Malta, where for so long HMS Upholder was based. The ship and her company are gone, but the example and inspiration remain."
In all, Upholder was credited with having sunk 97,000 tons of enemy shipping, in addition to three U-boats and one destroyer.

Quoted by Admiral of the Fleet, The Lord Fieldhouse GCB, GBE probably during the Falklands War:
"I can do no better than repeat the unique message following the sinking of HMS Upholder on April 14th 1942 : 'The ship and her company are gone but the example and inspiration remain'"

Notes

References

 

1940 ships
Ships built in Barrow-in-Furness
British U-class submarines
Lost submarines of the United Kingdom
Maritime incidents in April 1942
Ships lost with all hands
World War II shipwrecks in the Mediterranean Sea
World War II submarines of the United Kingdom
Submarines sunk by Italian warships